is a 1967 Japanese jidaigeki film directed by Masaki Kobayashi. The film is based on Hairyozuma shimatsu, a short story
by Yasuhiko Takiguchi.

Film historian Donald Richie suggests an approximate translation for its original Japanese title, "Rebellion: Receive the Wife".

Plot
In the Edo period of Japan, in the year 1725, Isaburo Sasahara (Toshiro Mifune) is a vassal of the daimyo of the Aizu clan, Masakata Matsudaira. Isaburo is one of the most skilled swordsmen in the land, whose principal rival is his good friend Tatewaki Asano (Tatsuya Nakadai). Isaburo is in a loveless marriage with a shrew of a woman. One day, one of the daimyo's advisors orders Isaburo's elder son Yogoro (Go Kato) to marry the daimyo's ex-concubine, Ichi (Yoko Tsukasa), even though she is the mother to one of the daimyo's sons. With much trepidation, the family agrees. In time, Ichi and Yogoro find love and happiness in the marriage and a daughter, Tomi, is born.

However, the daimyo's primary heir dies, and he orders his ex-concubine to rejoin his household to care for their son and heir. The family refuses, but Ichi is tricked into the castle by Isaburo's younger son, otherwise her husband and father-in-law will be ordered to commit seppuku for their insolence and insubordination. Isaburo counters that he will comply only if the heads of the daimyo and his two primary advisors are brought to him first. Isaburo sends his younger son and wife away and dismisses his household servants.With his elder son, he prepares for battle, removing the tatami from his house to prevent slipping in the blood that will be spilled and removing the house's walls to allow for more space for combat.

The daimyo's steward, accompanied by a platoon of 20 samurai, brings Ichi to the Sasahara house and tries to force her at spear point to renounce her marriage to Yogoro and join the daimyo's household. The daimyo also "graciously" offers to commute Isaburo and Yogoro's sentences to life confinement in a shrine outside his castle.Not only does Ichi refuse to join his household, she throws herself onto a spear instead of abandoning her husband. Her husband goes to her side and is killed with her in his arms.His father, enraged, kills the steward's entire party, killing the steward last as he attempts to flee.

Burying the dead couple, Isaburo now decides to take his case to the shogun in Edo regardless of the consequences to his clan, accompanied by Tomi. Tatewaki, who is guarding the gate, cannot permit Isaburo to pass, and a climactic duel follows with his good friend. Isaburo is the victor, but assassins hidden nearby cut Isaburo down with musket fire. As Isaburo dies, we see Tomi's wet-nurse comforting the baby: she has been secretly following him.

Cast 
Toshiro Mifune as Isaburo Sasahara 
Yoko Tsukasa as Ichi Sasahara 
Go Kato as Yogoro Sasahara 
Tatsuya Nakadai as Tatewaki Asano 
Shigeru Koyama as Geki Takahashi 
Masao Mishima as Sanzaemon Yanase 
Isao Yamagata as Shobei Tsuchiya 
Tatsuyoshi Ehara as Bunzo Sasahara
Etsuko Ichihara as Kiku
Tatsuo Matsumura as Masakata Matsudaira 
Takamaru Sasaki as Kenmotsu Sasahara
Jun Hamamura as Hyoemon Shiomi

Music
The music, by Tōru Takemitsu, is performed almost exclusively on traditional Japanese instruments, including shakuhachi, biwa, and taiko.

Release
Samurai Rebellion received a roadshow release in Japan on 27 May 1967 where it was distributed by Toho. The film received a wide theatrical release in Japan on 3 June 1967 and was released by Toho International in December 1967, with English-subtitles and a 120-minute running time. It has been released to home video under the title of Samurai Rebellion.

Awards
Samurai Rebellion received awards in Japan, including Kinema Junpo awarding it Best Film, Best Director (Kobayashi), Best Screenplay (Shinobu Hashimoto (also for Kihachi Okamoto's Japan's Longest Day)). Mainichi Film Concours awarded it as Best Film of the year. Along with China is Near, it won the FIPRESCI Prize at the Venice Film Festival.

Other adaptations
A TV movie remake starring Masakazu Tamura as Isaburo Sasahara and Yukie Nakama as Ichi Sasahara aired on TV Asahi in 2013. Screenplay by Shinobu Hashimoto.

 Naoto Ogata as Yoichiro Sasahara
 Masahiko Tsugawa as Kenmotsu Sasahara
 Ren Osugi as Masakata Matsudaira
 Takashi Sasano as Shobei Tanimura
 Meiko Kaji as Suga Sasahara
 Ken Matsudaira as Tatewaki Asano

References

Sources

External links
 
 
 
 

1967 films
Best Film Kinema Junpo Award winners
Films directed by Masaki Kobayashi
Japanese epic films
1960s Japanese-language films
Jidaigeki films
Samurai films
Toho films
Films with screenplays by Shinobu Hashimoto
Films produced by Toshiro Mifune
Films produced by Tomoyuki Tanaka
Films scored by Toru Takemitsu
Films set in castles
1960s Japanese films